The KGP-9 is a Hungarian submachine gun used by Hungary's military forces and prison guards. It operates using a basic blowback mechanism, and fires the very popular 9mm Parabellum cartridge from a closed bolt.  It is assembled from pressed steel, reinforced with castings.  The KGP-9 fires with a hammer mechanism and with a floating firing pin contained in the bolt, and is capable of a firing rate of 900 rounds/min.

The standard issue barrel can be replaced by a longer one, turning the gun into a carbine with longer range than a submachine gun.  The civilian variant is the KGPF-9, it is capable of semi-automatic fire only.

References
 Military Small Arms of the 20th Century by Ian Hogg and John Weeks

9mm Parabellum submachine guns
Submachine guns of Hungary
Fegyver- és Gépgyár firearms